The name Fred has been used for a total of six tropical cyclones worldwide, three in the Atlantic Ocean, two in the Western Pacific Ocean, and one in the Australian region of the Indian Ocean.
 
In the Atlantic:
 Hurricane Fred (2009) – Category 3 major hurricane that stayed out at sea.
 Hurricane Fred (2015) – Category 1 hurricane that made landfall in Cape Verde.
 Tropical Storm Fred (2021) – made landfall in Hispaniola, degenerated into a tropical wave, then regenerated and made a second landfall in the Florida Panhandle at tropical storm strength. 

In the Western Pacific:
 Typhoon Fred (1991) (T9111, 12W) – Category 2 typhoon that struck Hainan Island and Vietnam.
 Typhoon Fred (1994) (T9416, 19W, Susang) – Category 4 super typhoon that struck China, resulting on over 1,000 deaths and damages estimated at $874.4 million (1994 USD).

In the Australian Region:
 Cyclone Fred (1980) – Category 4 severe tropical cyclone that stayed out at sea.

See also 
 Hurricane Frederic, a similar name used once in the Atlantic Ocean in 1979.
 List of storms named Freda, a similar name used in the Western Pacific Ocean and the Southern Hemisphere
 List of tropical cyclones named Freddy, another similar name used in the Southern Hemisphere.

Atlantic hurricane set index articles
Pacific typhoon set index articles
Australian region cyclone set index articles